Byl jednou jeden polda  is a Czech comedy film directed by Jaroslav Soukup. It was released in 1995.

Cast and characters 
 Ladislav Potměšil - Major Maisner
 Rudolf Hrušínský - Robert
 Simona Krainová - Captain of FBI
 Petra Martincová - Boženka
 Tomáš Matonoha - Štefan
 Miroslav Moravec - Deputy Minister of Interior
 Jaroslav Sypal - Hrubec

Plot 
Commander of Police academy, major Václav Maisner, introduces a new training method entitled "school game", inspired by American movie series Police Academy. By Deputy Minister of Interior is he informed, that he had incognito in academy an agent of FBI. He is decided, discover, which recruit is that FBI agent.

External links
 

1995 films
1995 comedy films
Czech comedy films
1990s Czech-language films